Zampano is an Italian surname, may refer to:

 Francesco Zampano (born 1993), Italian footballer
 Giuseppe Zampano (born 1993), Italian footballer
 Robert Carmine Zampano  Federal Judge for the United States
 A character in the film La Strada
 A character in House of Leaves
 Zampano, an album by 747s

Italian-language surnames